Matihani is a municipality situated in Mahottari District of Nepal. The Municipality is well known for its historical significance and its festivities. The municipality was formed in 2016 from its current 9 wards from 9 former VDCs. It occupies an area of 29.02 sq. km with a total population of 31,026.

Historical importance

Matihani is considered the gateway to the Ramayana in Nepal. Matihani is located at the Indian border and was where Matkor of Mata Sita were conducted in the treta yuga. In a traditional mithila marriage, the Matkor ceremony is conducted when the groom comes to the bride place for marriage. Bedi is a ritual where mud is used for the Matkor ceremony. In the annual wedding ceremony (Bibah Panchmi), which takes place every year at Janakpur, the mud is taken from the pond nearby of Swami Laxmi Narayan temple.

The king of Sen dynasty met a Tasmaniya baba who was meditating in the jungle of Matihani and asked how to get a son. The saint said to the kist that the wishes of the king was fulfilled and returned to Matihani to build a school. Ju then built the Sanskrit school and the Laxmi Narayan temple.

Religion
The second largest Laxmi Narayan temple of Nepal is located at the center of Matihani. The pond surrounding Laxmi Narayan temple which is commonly known as "Laxmi Narayan pond" is associated with the marriage ceremony of goddess Sita and lord Rama according to the Ramayan, a holy book of Hinduism. The ceremony of Sita "matkor" was held here.

Schools and literacy in Matihani
Yjnayavalkya Lakshminarayan Vidyapeeth is the constituent unit of Nepal Sanskrit University. It provides Sanskrit and Hindu Vedic education to students from India and Nepal. It was built by the Sen dynasty. They also built the Lakshminarayan Mandir in the village. This is a very historical college in Nepal. It is located at the Indo-Nepal Border at Madhwapur-Matihani village group.

Currently the village has a government school and some small schools, but Damodar Academy (school in Parikauli) provides bus service to the students lifting the education system of the village. The village is also home to one of the oldest sanskrit school of Nepal.

Children have to go either to the Damodar Academy (Nepal) which is around 10 km from Matihani, or Delhi Public School (India) which is approximately 4-5 km from Matihani; also they may have to cross the border of Nepal and India. Some children however, go to a nearby governmental school.

References

External links
Official website of Municipality
UN map of the municipalities of Mahottari District

Populated places in Mahottari District
Nepal municipalities established in 2017
Municipalities in Madhesh Province